LifeHand is a thought-controlled prosthesis, a scientific device that enables a person to control a robotic hand using only their mind. It's the result of a €2 million ($3 million), five-year project funded by the European Union.

The project, coordinated by Sant'Anna School of Advanced Studies involved the implantation of four electrodes into the nervous system of Pierpaolo Petruzziello's left arm for a one-month period, allowing him to control a four-fingered robot hand to achieve complex movements. The implantation took place into the Campus Bio-Medico University of Rome, the other research partner involved in the experimentation.

The project followed on from the 2002 three-month experiment of Kevin Warwick and Peter Kyberd, which involved the implantation of 100 electrodes into the nervous system to control a two-fingered robot hand with less dexterity but with touch feedback.

References

External links
BBC video on LifeHand
pictures via Engadget
Lab Robotica Biomedica, the lab behind the project, located in Rome, Italy.

Prosthetics